List of the National Register of Historic Places listings in Queens, New York

This is intended to be a complete list of properties and districts listed on the National Register of Historic Places in Queens, New York.  The locations of National Register properties and districts (at least for all showing latitude and longitude coordinates below) may be seen in a map by clicking on "Map of all coordinates". Four of the properties are further designated as U.S. National Historic Landmarks.



Listings county-wide

|}

See also

 Statewide: National Register of Historic Places listings in New York
 Citywide: Manhattan, Brooklyn, Staten Island, Bronx
 List of New York City Designated Landmarks in Queens

References

External links
Newsday article - last visited March 2006

Queens, New York City
Queens
Buildings and structures in Queens, New York